Treat Conrad Huey (born August 28, 1985) is a Filipino-American tennis player who represents the Philippines in international competitions. He turned professional in 2008 and he started representing the Philippines in the Davis Cup and the Southeast Asian Games in 2009.  Huey specializes in doubles and has reached eighteen finals on the ATP World Tour. He won titles at the 2012 Citi Open, 2013 Swiss Indoors, and 2014 Aegon International alongside Dominic Inglot, 2015 Estoril Open with Scott Lipsky, 2015 St. Petersburg Open and 2015 Malaysian Open, Kuala Lumpur with Henri Kontinen, 2016 Abierto Mexicano Telcel with Max Mirnyi and the 2017 Los Cabos Open with Juan Sebastian Cabal.

Huey reached his career-high doubles ranking of world No. 18 in July 2016. Among his partners were Somdev Devvarman, Brian Battistone, Jeff Coetzee, Harsh Mankad, Jerzy Janowicz, Dominic Inglot, Jack Sock, Jonathan Erlich, Scott Lipsky, Max Mirnyi and Henri Kontinen.

In 2012, Huey became a member of the World Team Tennis' Washington Kastles due to the absence of Leander Paes (competing in the 2012 London Olympics). Huey also participated in the International Premier Tennis League (IPTL). Treat Huey participated as coach and player in the IPTL with the Philippine Mavericks.

He is the first Filipino player to reach the doubles semifinals at the Wimbledon Championships partnering Belarusian Max Mirnyi.

In 2019, Huey returned to his college alma mater to attend the Charlottesville Men’s Pro Challenger Tournament hosted by the University of Virginia.

Career highlights

2015: New partnership, Three ATP titles
Huey started the year by reaching the Australian Open third round alongside Jonathan Erlich, losing to Feliciano Lopez and Max Mirnyi in straight sets. 

He then reached the semifinals of the 2015 Ecuador Open Quito with new partner Scott Lipsky, losing to Victor Estrella Burgos and João Souza in two tiebreak sets. He then reached the semifinals of the 2015 Memphis Open with Lipsky, losing to Artem Sitak and Donald Young in two tight sets. He continued his good run of form at the 2015 Delray Beach International Tennis Championships, reaching the quarterfinals with Lipsky but losing to Raven Klaasen and Leander Paes in straight sets. He then lost in the first round of the 2015 Abierto Mexicano Telcel with Lipsky, losing to Ivan Dodig and Marcelo Melo in straight sets. 

He then represented the Philippines at the 2015 Davis Cup partnering Francis Casey Alcantara. The defeated Sri Lanka's Sharmal Dissanayake and Dineshkanthan Thangarajah. The Philippines went on to win the tie 5–0.

He went on to play the 2015 Irving Challenger, reaching the quarterfinals with partner Lipsky, losing to Pablo Andujar and Diego Schwartzman in straight sets. He then reached the final of the 2015 US Men's Clay Court Championships with Lipsky, losing to Ričardas Berankis and Teymuraz Gabashvili in straight sets. He went on to play the 2015 Sarasota Challenger, but he and Lipsky were forced to retire in their quarterfinal match with Hyeon Chung and Divij Sharan leading 7–6(6), 0–1. They next played the 2015 BRD Năstase Țiriac Trophy, losing to Colin Fleming and Jonathan Marray in three sets in the quarterfinals. 

Huey and Lipsky then went on to win their first team title and the fourth of Huey's career at the 2015 Estoril Open against top seeds Marc López and David Marrero. Huey and Lipsky next participated at the 2015 Geneva Open reaching the semifinals losing to Raven Klaasen and Yen-Hsun Lu in two tight sets. They then competed at the 2015 French Open losing in the first round to Marin Draganja and Henri Kontinen in three sets. 

He then participated at a Challenger event in Ilkley, Great Britain with Somdev Devvarman losing in the first round to Johan Brunstrom and Matwe Middelkoop in three sets. He next competed with regular partner Scott Lipsky at the 2015 Aegon Open Nottingham losing in the first round to top seeds Marcel Granollers and Leander Paes in three sets.
In July, Huey and Lipsky then played at the 2015 Wimbledon Championships beating 12th seeds Pablo Cuevas and David Marrero in straight sets before going on to lose to Jonathan Erlich and Philipp Petzschner. He then travelled to Taiwan to play the 2015 Davis Cup Asia/Oceana group II 2nd round against Chinese Taipei in which he partnered compatriot Ruben Gonzales to win the doubles rubber.

He went on to win two more titles at the 2015 St. Petersburg Open in September and at the 2015 Malaysian Open, Kuala Lumpur in October with Henri Kontinen.

Significant finals

Masters 1000 finals

Doubles: 1 (1 runner-up)

ATP career finals

Doubles: 18 (8 titles, 10 runner-ups)

Challenger and Futures finals

Doubles: 52 (29 titles, 23 runner-ups)

Doubles performance timeline

Current through the 2022 Delray Beach Open.

References

External links
Official website 
 
 
 

Filipino male tennis players
Sportspeople from Charlottesville, Virginia
Tennis people from Virginia
Tennis players from Washington, D.C.
1985 births
Living people
American sportspeople of Filipino descent
Tennis players at the 2010 Asian Games
Tennis players at the 2014 Asian Games
Virginia Cavaliers men's tennis players
Southeast Asian Games gold medalists for the Philippines
Southeast Asian Games silver medalists for the Philippines
Southeast Asian Games bronze medalists for the Philippines
Southeast Asian Games medalists in tennis
Competitors at the 2009 Southeast Asian Games
Competitors at the 2011 Southeast Asian Games
Competitors at the 2015 Southeast Asian Games
Asian Games competitors for the Philippines
Competitors at the 2021 Southeast Asian Games
Citizens of the Philippines through descent